The 2005–06 Chicago Bulls season was one of mixed results. While the Bulls reached the playoffs for a second straight season, they posted a record of just 41–41 (.500) in the regular season, 6 wins fewer than they had recorded in the previous year even though the roster was mostly the same.

In the playoffs, the Bulls lost to the eventual NBA champion, the Miami Heat, in six games in the First Round.

On December 9, 2005, the Bulls' retired Scottie Pippen's jersey number 33 on his rafters during halftime ceremony reunited with his former teammates Michael Jordan, Horace Grant, Dennis Rodman, Craig Hodges, Randy Brown, his former assistant coach Johnny Bach, and former Bulls head coach Phil Jackson.

Offseason
The Bulls did not have any picks in the 2005 draft. The core of the team remained based around Ben Gordon, Luol Deng, and Kirk Hinrich, all draft picks from the previous two years. The Bulls did not sign any household name players through free agency, but did add Malik Allen, Darius Songaila and Michael Sweetney (through the trade explained below), all of which would split time between the starting lineup and the bench. They also added Tim Thomas; however due to a clash with Scott Skiles he appeared in just 3 games for the Bulls and would eventually move to the Phoenix Suns. The Bulls also traded their once first-round draft pick Eddy Curry to the Knicks after Curry missed some of the 2004–05 season with a heart condition. The move was met with some controversy, although it ended up resulting in high draft picks for the Bulls due to the Knicks' poor records in the coming seasons.

NBA Draft

The Bulls did not have any draft picks in 2005.

Roster

Regular season

Standings

Record vs. opponents

Playoffs
At 41–41 (.500) record, the Bulls managed to sneak into the Eastern Conference Playoffs as a 7th seed. They would lose in the first round to the eventual NBA Champion Miami Heat, although they did manage to stretch the best of 7 series to 6 games, ending a season in which they played very inconsistently on a somewhat positive note. A year later, the Bulls would defeat the Heat in a sweep in the first round.

|- align="center" bgcolor="#ffcccc"
| 1
| April 22
| @ Miami
| L 106–111
| Ben Gordon (35)
| Andrés Nocioni (16)
| Kirk Hinrich (8)
| American Airlines Arena20,288
| 0–1
|- align="center" bgcolor="#ffcccc"
| 2
| April 24
| @ Miami
| L 108–115
| Andrés Nocioni (35)
| Tyson Chandler (9)
| Kirk Hinrich (7)
| American Airlines Arena20,214
| 0–2
|- align="center" bgcolor="#ccffcc"
| 3
| April 27
| Miami
| W 109–90
| Ben Gordon (24)
| Andrés Nocioni (9)
| Kirk Hinrich (11)
| United Center22,133
| 1–2
|- align="center" bgcolor="#ccffcc"
| 4
| April 30
| Miami
| W 93–87
| Andrés Nocioni (24)
| Andrés Nocioni (7)
| Kirk Hinrich (9)
| United Center22,361
| 2–2
|- align="center" bgcolor="#ffcccc"
| 5
| May 2
| @ Miami
| L 78–92
| Andrés Nocioni (23)
| Andrés Nocioni (10)
| Kirk Hinrich (5)
| American Airlines Arena20,287
| 2–3
|- align="center" bgcolor="#ffcccc"
| 6
| May 4
| Miami
| L 96–113
| Kirk Hinrich (23)
| Luol Deng (6)
| Kirk Hinrich (6)
| United Center22,584
| 2–4
|-

Awards and records

Transactions
 August 8, 2005: Signed G Eddie Basden
 August 15, 2005: Resigned G Chris Duhon
 August 26, 2005: Resigned F Othella Harrington
 September 1, 2005: Resigned C Tyson Chandler
 September 2, 2005: Signed F Malik Allen
 September 23, 2005: Signed F Darius Songaila
 October 3, 2005: Resigned G Jannero Pargo
 October 4, 2005: Traded C Eddy Curry and F Antonio Davis to the New York Knicks for F Mike Sweetney, F Tim Thomas, G Jermaine Jackson, a conditional first round draft pick and two second round draft picks
 October 18, 2005: Waived G Jermaine Jackson
 January 5, 2006: Signed F Randy Holcomb to a 10-day contract
 January 17, 2006: Signed G Stephen Graham to a 10-day contract
 January 27, 2006: Signed F James Thomas to a 10-day contract
 March 1, 2006: Waived F Tim Thomas
 March 5, 2006: Signed C Luke Schenscher to a 10-day contract
 March 15, 2006: Signed C Luke Schenscher to a 10-day contract
 March 22, 2006: Signed G Randy Livingston to a 10-day contract
 March 25, 2006: Signed C Luke Schenscher for the season

References

Chicago Bulls seasons
Chicago
Chicago
Chicago